Elias von Cyon, also known as Elie de Cyon, born Ilya Fadeyevich Tsion (Russian- Илья Фаддеевич Цион); (March 25, 1843 – 1912) was a Russian-French physiologist born to Jewish parents in Telšiai, Russian Empire (today Lithuania).  His father was a Cantonist.

Son of Pinkhos (Faddey) Cyon and his wife Sarah; he had an elder brother Moses (born 1840). Cyon studied medicine at the medical-surgical academy in Warsaw, at the University of Kyiv and in Berlin. He obtained a degree in medicine in Kyiv in 1864. In 1866 he worked in Leipzig as an assistant to Carl Ludwig (1816–1895), with whom he collaborated on creation of the first isolated perfused frog heart preparation.

From 1867 he taught classes on anatomy and physiology at the University of St. Petersburg, where he was assistant to the director of the physiology laboratory, Filipp Ovsyannikov. At St. Petersburg one of his students was Ivan Pavlov (1849–1936). In 1870 he became an associate professor, and following student protests concerning his political views, he relocated to Paris in 1877. In Paris he attained French citizenship and worked with famed physiologist Claude Bernard (1813–1881).

His name is associated with "Cyon's nerve" (aortic nerve), which is a branch of the vagus nerve that terminates in the aortic arch and base of the heart. It is composed entirely of afferent fibers.

He converted to Catholicism in 1908 and is claimed to have written parts of The Protocols of Zion.

References 

Russian physiologists
1843 births
1912 deaths
People from Telšiai
Academic staff of Saint Petersburg State University
Taras Shevchenko National University of Kyiv alumni
20th-century Russian scientists
19th-century scientists from the Russian Empire
Converts to Roman Catholicism from Judaism